Juwangsan is a mountain of Gyeongsangbuk-do, eastern South Korea. It has an elevation of 721 metres.

See also
 Juwangsan National Park
List of mountains of Korea

References

Mountains of South Korea
Mountains of North Gyeongsang Province
Taebaek Mountains